The nasal glands are the seromucous glands in the respiratory region of the nasal mucous membrane. The three major types of nasal glands are anterior serous glands, seromucous glands, and Bowman glands.

Glands

Anterior serous glands
The anterior nasal glands help moisturize the nasal mucosa.

Seromucous glands
The seromucous glands are found primarily in the anterior nasal cavity, and they are also found within the nasal cavity.

Bowman glands
The Bowman glands are serous glands that help the olfactory region with smelling.

Notes
Medical Definition
Pediatric Otolaryngology

References

Glands
Nose